Kunik is a brand of cow and goat milk cheese. It is described by the producer as a semi-aged, triple cream wheel cheese made from 25% Jersey cow cream and 75% goat's milk. It has an edible, bloomy white rind; a tangy, buttery flavor; and a thick, smooth, creamy texture. The addition of high-milkfat Jersey cow cream makes the cheese more rich and flavorful than a brie cheese, but less pungent than a pure goat cheese.
Anne Saxelby, reviewing the cheese for Esquire, stated "it may very well be the sexiest cheese in the U.S.A."

Production

Kunik is produced at Nettle Meadow Goat Farm in Thurman, New York.
The farm is basically an animal sanctuary, funded by the income from cheese sales.

See also
 List of cheeses
 List of goat milk cheeses

References 

American cheeses
Cow's-milk cheeses
Goat's-milk cheeses
Warren County, New York